Jung Jae-Eun (born 11 January 1980) is a South Korean taekwondo practitioner and Olympic champion. She competed at the 2000 Summer Olympics in Sydney, where she won the gold medal in the 57 kg competition.

References

External links

1980 births
Living people
South Korean female taekwondo practitioners
Olympic taekwondo practitioners of South Korea
Taekwondo practitioners at the 2000 Summer Olympics
Olympic gold medalists for South Korea
Olympic medalists in taekwondo
Medalists at the 2000 Summer Olympics
World Taekwondo Championships medalists
21st-century South Korean women